Stijn Dejonckheere (born ) is a Belgian male volleyball player. He is part of the Belgium men's national volleyball team. On club level he plays for Knack Roeselare.

References

External links
 profile at FIVB.org

1988 births
Living people
Belgian men's volleyball players
Place of birth missing (living people)